The 2013 PDC World Darts Championship PDPA Qualifier was a darts event that took place on November 26. Stuart Kellett won the event defeating John Bowles 5-1 in an all unseeded final. Kellett started in the first round while Bowles started in the preliminary round.

Results

2013 PDC World Darts Championship
Winner Stuart Kellett lost in round one to 19th seed Dutchman Vincent van der Voort by three sets without reply while runner up John Bowles won his preliminary round match beating Spanish qualifier Carlos Rodriguez by four legs to two and was then involved in two exciting matches. In round one, he defeated 29th seed Englishman Jamie Caven by three sets to two but in round two he lost to 4th seed Scotsman Gary Anderson by four sets to three.

References

2012 in darts
2012 in English sport